Blue from Heaven is a jazz album by Italian bassist Pierluigi Balducci with a quartet featuring Paul McCandless, John Taylor and Michele Rabbia. The album was released by the Italian label Dodicilune in December 2012.

Reception
All about jazz  review awarded the album 5 stars writing that "at just under 44 minutes, Blue from Heaven seems to pass by in an instant, but if there's truth in the adage "leave them hungry for more," Balducci succeeds in spades. He may have done so with musicians possessing considerably greater cachet, but throughout Blue from Heaven, this evocative and provocative bassist/composer is never less than a full-on and absolute equal."

Track listing

Personnel 
Paul McCandless - soprano saxophone, oboe
John Taylor - piano
Pierluigi Balducci - electric bass
Michele Rabbia - drums, percussion

References 

2012 albums
Jazz albums by Italian artists